QUT Kelvin Grove busway station is located in Brisbane, Australia adjacent to Queensland University of Technology's Kelvin Grove campus. It opened on 23 February 2004 on the first section of the Inner Northern Busway from the intersection of Roma Street to Herston.

The design of the station is very similar to Herston station and features golf ball protection screens due to the close proximity to Victoria Park Golf Course.

It is served by four routes all operated by Brisbane Transport.

References

External links
[ QUT Kelvin Grove station] TransLink

Bus stations in Brisbane
Kelvin Grove, Queensland
Queensland University of Technology
Transport infrastructure completed in 2004